Vavuniya Hospital is a government hospital in Vavuniya, Sri Lanka. It is the leading hospital in Vavuniya District and is controlled by the provincial government in Jaffna. As of 2010 it had 624 beds. The hospital is sometimes called Vavuniya General Hospital or Vavuniya District General Hospital.

References

Hospital
Hospitals in Vavuniya District
Provincial government hospitals in Sri Lanka